Luis Conte (born 16 November 1954) is a Cuban percussionist best-known for his performances in the bands of artists including James Taylor, Madonna, Pat Metheny Group, Eric Clapton, Carlos Santana, Phil Collins, Rod Stewart and Shakira. He began his music career as a studio musician for Latin Jazz acts like Caldera. Conte's live performance and touring career took off when he joined Madonna's touring band in the 1980s. Neil Strauss of The New York Times describes Conte's playing as "grazing Latin-style percussion".

Conte immigrated to Los Angeles in 1967, where he attended Los Angeles City College studying music, and entrenched himself in the music community. Conte's career includes composing and playing in ABC TV's Dancing with the Stars band, along with many TV and film projects.

Early years 
Conte was born in Santiago de Cuba. As a child, Conte began his musical odyssey playing the guitar. However, he soon switched to percussion, and that has remained his primary instrument ever since.

He was sent to Los Angeles by his parents in 1967, in order to prevent him from being forced to serve in the Cuban military. This was a turning point in Conte's life, as the musical community in Los Angeles during this period was quite vibrant. It was during this period that he studied at Los Angeles City College.

Musical career 

Conte proved himself versatile musically, and by 1973, he was playing regularly in local clubs. He quickly became a busy studio musician, and throughout the 1970s, he played in the Latin Jazz band Caldera.

In the 1980s, Conte toured with several different musicians, including Madonna, guitarist Al Di Meola, and Andy Narell. His debut as a bandleader came in 1987, when he released La Cocina Caliente, which included a Latinized version of Chopin's "Susarasa". Conte also played percussion on the Pat Metheny Group release 'We Live Here', in 1995, on the Pat Metheny 'From This Place', in 2020 as well as I Mother Earth's first two albums Dig (1993) and Scenery and Fish (1996).

Conte has toured as part of James Taylor's "Band of Legends." He has also played alongside musicians including Alex Acuña, Jaguares, Larry Klimas, and David Garfield, both as a bandleader and a sideman.

Luis Conte was part of Phil Collins 1997 "Dance into the Light" tour and 2004 "First Farewell Tour", performing in both of them Afro-Cuban percussion and adding more depth into the concert songs. He also performed during The Phil Collins Big Band tours in 1996 and 1998 and again during the Phil Collins Not Dead Yet tours 2017/2018.

In 1999 Conte collaborated in Maná MTV Unplugged project.

In 2009 worked together with Sergio Vallín in his Bendito Entre Las Mujeres album.

Discography

As leader/co-leader
La Cocina Caliente (Denon, 1987)
Black Forest (Denon, 1989)
The Road (Weber Works, 1995)
Cuban Dreams (Unitone Recording, 2000)
En Casa De Luis (BFM Jazz, 2011)

As sideman (in alphabetical order)

With Peter Allen
 Making Every Moment Count (RCA Records, 1990)

With Anastacia
 Not That Kind (Epic Records, 2000)

With Angelica
 Angelica (Arista Records, 1997)

With Paul Anka
 Rock Swings (Verve, 2005)

With Patti Austin
 On the Way to Love (Warner Bros. Records, 2001)
 Sound Advice (Shanachie Records, 2011)

With George Benson
 Absolute Benson (Verve, 2000)

With Michelle Branch
 Hotel Paper (Maverick Records, 2003)

With Jackson Browne
 I'm Alive (Elektra Records, 1993)
 Looking East (Elektra Records, 1996)
 The Naked Ride Home (Elektra Records, 2002)
 Standing in the Breach (Inside Recordings, 2014)

With George Cables
 Shared Secrets (MuseFX, 2001)

With Glen Campbell
 Meet Glen Campbell (Capitol Records, 2008)

With Belinda Carlisle
 Runaway Horses (MCA Records, 1989)
 Live Your Life Be Free (MCA Records, 1991)

With Steven Curtis Chapman
 All About Love (Sparrow Records, 2003)

With Cher
 Love Hurts (Geffen, 1991)

With Chicago
 Night & Day: Big Band (Giant, 1995)

With Toni Childs
 House of Hope (A&M Records, 1991)

With Joe Cocker
 Across from Midnight (CMC International, 1997)

With Natalie Cole
 Good to Be Back (Elektra Records, 1989)
 Take a Look (Elektra Records, 1993)

With Phil Collins and The Phil Collins Big Band
 A Hot Night in Paris (Atlantic Records, 1999) 
 Phil Collins Live At Montreux, (DVD, 2010)

With Rita Coolidge
 Behind the Memories (Pony Canyon Records, 1995)

With David Crosby
 Thousand Roads (Atlantic Records, 1993)

With Gavin DeGraw
 Gavin DeGraw (J Records, 2008)

With Céline Dion
 Falling into You (Columbia Records, 1996)
 A New Day Has Come (Columbia Records, 2002)
 One Heart (Columbia Records, 2003)

With Lara Fabian
 Lara Fabian (Columbia Records, 1999)

With John Fogerty
 Blue Moon Swamp (Warner Bros. Records, 1997)

With Aretha Franklin
 This Christmas, Aretha (DMI Records, 2008)

With Nelly Furtado
 Loose (Interscope Records, 2006)

With Charlotte Gainsbourg
 IRM (Elektra Records, 2009)

With Josh Groban
 All That Echoes (Reprise Records, 2013)
 Bridges (Reprise Records, 2018)

With Thelma Houston
 Throw You Down (Reprise Records, 1990)
 A Woman's Touch (Shout Factory, 2007)

With Al Jarreau
 Tomorrow Today (GRP, 2000)
 Accentuate the Positive (GRP Records, 2004)

With Jewel
 Spirit (Atlantic Records, 1998)
 Goodbye Alice in Wonderland (Atlantic Records, 2006)

With Elton John
 Duets (Rocket, 1993)

With Gregg Karukas
 Sound Of Emotion (Positive Music Records, 1991)
 Summerhouse (101 South Records, 1994)
 You'll Know It's Me (Fahreheit Records, 1995)
 Blue Touch (i.e. music, 1998)
 Nightshift (N-Coded Music, 2000)
 Heatwave (N-Coded Music, 2002)
 GK (Trippin 'N' Rhythm Records, 2009)

With Chaka Khan
 Funk This (Burgundy Records, 2007)

With Patti LaBelle
 Miss Patti's Christmas (Def Soul Classics, 2007)

With David Lasley
 Soldiers on the Moon (Pony Canyon Records, 1989)

With Julian Lennon
 Mr. Jordan (Virgin Records, 1989)

With Kenny Loggins
 Back to Avalon (Columbia Records, 1988)
 Leap of Faith (Columbia Records, 1991)

With Madonna
 Like a Prayer (Warner Bros. Records, 1989)

With Ziggy Marley
 Dragonfly (Private Music, 2003)
 Love Is My Religion (Tuff Gong Worldwide, 2006)

With Richard Marx
 Paid Vacation (Capitol Records, 1994)

With Christine McVie
 In the Meantime (Sanctuary Records, 2004)

With Bette Midler
 It's the Girls! (Warner Bros. Records, 2014)

With Kylie Minogue
 Rhythm of Love (Mushroom Records, 1990)

With Michael Nesmith
 Tropical Campfires (Pacific Art Corporation, 1992)
 Rays (Pacific Arts Corporation, 2005)

With Jennifer Paige
 Jennifer Paige (Hollywood Records, 1998)

With Bonnie Raitt
 Slipstream (Redwing Records, 2012)

With Emily Remler
 This Is Me (Justice Records, 1990)

With LeAnn Rimes
 Twisted Angel (Curb Records, 2002)

With Linda Ronstadt
 Frenesí (Elektra Records, 1992)

With Brenda Russell
 Kiss Me with the Wind (A&M Records, 1990)
 Soul Talkin (EMI, 1993)
 Between the Sun and the Moon (Dome Records, 2004)With Boz Scaggs Fade Into Light (MVP Japan, 1996)With Selena Dreaming of You (EMI, 1995)With Shakira Fijación Oral, Vol. 1 (Epic Records, 2005)
 Oral Fixation, Vol. 2 (Epic Records, 2005)With Vonda Shepard Vonda Shepard (Reprise Records, 1989)With Lisa Stansfield Lisa Stansfield (Arista Records, 1997)With Rod Stewart Vagabond Heart (Warner Bros. Records, 1991)With Curtis Stigers Brighter Days (Columbia Records, 1999)With Barbra Streisand Encore: Movie Partners Sing Broadway (Columbia Records, 2016)With James Taylor October Roads (Columbia Records, 2002)
 A Christmas Album (Hallmark Cards, 2004)
 James Taylor at Christmas (Columbia Records, 2006)
 Covers (Hear Music, 2008)
 Other Covers (Hear Music, 2009)
 Before This World (Concord Records, 2015)
 American Standard (Fantasy Records, 2020)With Terence Trent D'Arby Vibrator (Columbia Records, 1995)With Julieta Venegas Bueninvento (RCA International, 2000)With Roger Waters Amused to Death (Columbia Records, 1992)With Tony Joe White Lake Placid Blues (Remark Records, 1995)
 One Hot July (Mercury Records, 1998)With Deniece Williams Special Love (MCA Records, 1989)With Paul Young The Crossing (Columbia Records, 1993)

With Carlos Santana 
(Supernatural) BMG 2000With Warren Zevon'''
 The Wind'' (Artemis Records, 2003)

References

Notes

External links 
Official website
BFM Jazz
 Luis Conte School of Percussion 

1954 births
Living people
Los Angeles City College alumni
Cuban percussionists
Pat Metheny Group members
American rock percussionists
Cuban emigrants to the United States
Lyle Lovett and His Large Band members
The Phil Collins Big Band members